Manuela Hărăbor (born 2 April 1968 in Bucharest) is a Romanian actress. She debuted in 1972 as a 4-years old girl in the film Veronica. She became popular after playing the role of Simina in the film The Forest Woman (Pădureanca, 1987). Manuela Hărăbor graduated from the Bucharest Academy of Theatre and Film in 1991.

Personal life
Hărăbor has one son, Andrei.

Filmography
 Veronica (1972)
 Veronica se întoarce (1973)
 Ma-ma (1976)
 Gustul și culoarea fericirii (1978)
 Trenul de aur (1986)
 The Forest Woman (Pădureanca, 1987) – Simina
 Secretul lui Nemesis (1987)
 Martori dispăruți (1988) – Roxana
 Secretul armei secrete (1988) – Frumoasa
 Lacrima cerului (1989) – Roxana
 Legenda carpatină (1989)
 Mircea (1989)
 Rochia albă de dantelă (1989)
 Coroana de foc (1990)
 Crucea de piatră (1993) – Ilonka Sabo
 Doi haiduci și o crâșmăriță (1993) – Stana
 Invisible: The Chronicles of Benjamin Knight (1994) – Kidnapped Girl
 Ochii care nu se văd (1994) – Ica
 Meurtres par procuration (1995) – Daniela
 Camera ascunsă (2004) – Andreea
 Magnatul (2004)
 Cu un pas înainte (TV series, 2007) – Aurora Tomozei
 Fetele marinarului (TV series, 2009) – Virginia Trifan

References
 Manuela Hărăbor in PORT.ro
 Manuela Hărăbor, viața la 40 de ani, 30 noiembrie 2008, Monica Cismaru, Evenimentul zilei
 "Singurul loc in care astept sa ma intorc este teatrul", Bogdana Tihon Buliga, Formula AS – 

1968 births
Living people
Caragiale National University of Theatre and Film alumni
Romanian child actresses
Actresses from Bucharest
Romanian anti-abortion activists